Whitman is a crater on Mercury. Its name was adopted by the International Astronomical Union (IAU) in 1985. Whitman is named for American poet Walt Whitman.

The central peak complex of Whitman has bright spots on it which may be hollows.

To the south of Whitman is Gibran crater, and to the southwest is Damer.  The large crater Scarlatti is to the east, and Chŏng Chʼŏl is to the northwest.

References